Bethany Wilcock (born 3 January 2001) is an English rugby union player. She plays for Harlequins Women and is a member of England's 2021 Women's Six Nations Championship squad.

International career 
Wilcock first played for the England Sevens squad for the 2019/20 season. Her first appearance was at the World Series in Biarritz.

She went on to play 15s for the England U20s in 2018 and was invited to join the senior team as a development player for the 2021 Women's Six Nations Championship.

Club career 
Wilcock plays for Harlequins Women as a fullback, having joined the side in 2019.

References 

Living people
2001 births
English female rugby union players